The  command in the Unix family of computer operating systems is a utility that is used to compare two files for common and distinct lines.  is specified in the POSIX standard. It has been widely available on Unix-like operating systems since the mid to late 1980s.

History
Written by Lee E. McMahon,  first appeared in Version 4 Unix.

The version of  bundled in GNU coreutils was written by Richard Stallman and David MacKenzie.

Usage
 reads two files as input, regarded as lines of text.  outputs one file, which contains three columns. The first two columns contain lines unique to the first and second file, respectively. The last column contains lines common to both.

Columns are typically distinguished with the  character. If the input files contain lines beginning with the separator character, the output columns can become ambiguous.

For efficiency, standard implementations of  expect both input files to be sequenced in the same line collation order, sorted lexically. The sort (Unix) command can be used for this purpose.

The  algorithm makes use of the collating sequence of the current locale. If the lines in the files are not both collated in accordance with the current locale, the result is undefined.

Return code
Unlike , the return code from  has no logical significance concerning the relationship of the two files. A return code of 0 indicates success, a return code >0 indicates an error occurred during processing.

Example
$ cat foo
apple
banana
eggplant
$ cat bar
apple
banana
banana
zucchini
$ comm foo bar
                  apple
                  banana
          banana
eggplant
          zucchini

This shows that both files have one banana, but only bar has a second banana.

In more detail, the output file has the appearance that follows. Note that the column is interpreted by the number of leading tab characters. \t represents a tab character and \n represents a newline (Escape character#Programming and data formats).

Comparison to diff
The simpler  is best suited for use in scripts.

This can be useful if one wishes two lines to be considered different even if they only have subtle differences.

Other options
 has command-line options to suppress any of the three columns. This is useful for scripting.

There is also an option to read one file (but not both) from standard input.

Limits
Up to a full line must be buffered from each input file during line comparison, before the next output line is written.

Some implementations read lines with the function  which does not impose any line length limits if system memory suffices.

Other implementations read lines with the function . This function requires a fixed buffer. For these implementations, the buffer is often sized according to the POSIX macro .

See also
 Comparison of file comparison tools
 List of Unix commands
 cmp (Unix) – character oriented file comparison
 cut (Unix) – splitting column-oriented files

References

External links

 
 
 

Free file comparison tools
Comm
Unix SUS2008 utilities
Plan 9 commands
Inferno (operating system) commands